Sasan Sara (also Romanized as Sāsān Sarā) is a village in Gil Dulab Rural District, in the Central District of Rezvanshahr County, Gilan Province, Iran. At the 2006 census, its population was 450, in 128 families.

References 

Populated places in Rezvanshahr County